Sole Sisters, a.k.a. Only Girls (French title: Filles uniques), is a 2003 film directed by Pierre Jolivet.

Main cast
Sandrine Kiberlain – Carole
Sylvie Testud – Tina
Vincent Lindon – Adrien
François Berléand – Mermot

Plot
Carole, a Parisian judge, meets Tina, a thief who has been arrested twice for shoplifting expensive shoes.

References

External links

2003 films
2003 comedy films
Films directed by Pierre Jolivet
Films produced by Alain Sarde
French comedy films
2000s French films
2000s French-language films